The Three Musketeers is a 2014 South Korean television series starring Jung Yong-hwa, Lee Jin-wook, Yang Dong-geun, Jung Hae-in, and Seo Hyun-jin. Loosely based on Alexandre Dumas's 1844 novel The Three Musketeers, the series follows three Joseon-era adventurers who serve Crown Prince Sohyeon as his warrior guards. It aired on cable channel tvN from August 17 to November 2, 2014 on Sundays at 21:00 for 12 episodes.

But with low viewership ratings for its first season, plans for succeeding seasons have been postponed indefinitely.

Cast
Jung Yong-hwa as Park Dal-hyang (based on d'Artagnan)
Park Chang-ik as young Dal-hyang
Lee Jin-wook as Crown Prince Sohyeon (based on Athos)
Jung Taek-hyun as child Sohyeon
Ji Eun-sung as young Sohyeon
Yang Dong-geun as Heo Seung-po (based on Porthos)
Kim Joo-seung as young Seung-po
Jung Hae-in as Ahn Min-seo (based on Aramis)
Lee Joo-chan as young Min-seo
Seo Hyun-jin as Kang Yoon-seo (based on Anne of Austria)
Park So-young as young Yoon-seo
Yoo In-young as Jo Mi-ryung (based on Milady de Winter)
Kim Myung-soo as King Injo (based on Louis XIII)
Park Yeong-gyu as Kim Ja-jeom (based on Cardinal Richelieu)
Jeon No-min as Choi Myung-kil (based on de Tréville)
Lee Kyun as Pansoe (based on Planchet)
Kim Sung-min as Inggūldai (based on Duke of Buckingham)
Park Sung-min as Noh Soo (based on Comte de Rochefort)
Kang Ki-young as Ba-rang
Kim Seo-kyung as Ma Boo-dae
Jung Yoo-suk as Park Ji-won
Woo Hyun as Dal-hyang's father
Byun Joo-hyun as Hong Taiji
Han-min as Princess Jeongmyeong

Ratings
In this table,  represent the lowest ratings and  represent the highest ratings.

International broadcast
It aired in Thailand on PPTV beginning September 27, 2014.

References

External links
 
The Three Musketeers at Chorokbaem Media 
The Three Musketeers at JS Pictures 

2014 South Korean television series debuts
2014 South Korean television series endings
TVN (South Korean TV channel) television dramas
Television shows based on The Three Musketeers
South Korean historical television series
South Korean action television series
Television series by Chorokbaem Media
Cultural depictions of Cardinal Richelieu
Cultural depictions of Louis XIII
Television shows written by Song Jae-jung
Television series by JS Pictures